Aartje Elisabeth "Adrie" Lasterie (16 December 1943 – 22 March 1991) was a Dutch swimmer.

Lasterie competed in the 1964 Summer Olympics, where she won a silver-medal with the Dutch 4 × 100 m medley team. She swam the butterfly leg in the first heat, but did not swim in the final, where Ada Kok took her place. She also won three gold medals at the 1962 European Aquatics Championships. In 1961–1962 she set four European and ten national records in various freestyle and medley events.

References

External links 

 
 

1943 births
1991 deaths
Dutch female freestyle swimmers
Dutch female butterfly swimmers
Dutch female medley swimmers
Olympic silver medalists for the Netherlands
Olympic swimmers of the Netherlands
Swimmers at the 1964 Summer Olympics
Medalists at the 1964 Summer Olympics
Sportspeople from Hilversum
European Aquatics Championships medalists in swimming
20th-century Dutch women